William Parry FRS (3 July 1934 – 20 August 2006) was an English mathematician who worked in dynamical systems, and, in particular, ergodic theory. In particular, he studied subshifts of finite type nilflows.

Life

Bill Parry was born in Coventry in the Warwickshire (now the West Midlands), England, the sixth of seven children. Although he failed the eleven-plus exam, Parry was persuaded by his mathematics teacher at Coventry Junior Technical School, specialising in metalwork and woodwork, to aim for university. To get appropriate tuition, he had to travel to Birmingham Technical College. He won a place at University College London. Following an MSc at the University of Liverpool, he returned to London to study at Imperial College with Yael Dowker, obtaining his PhD in 1960, with thesis Ergodic and mixing transformations.

Having served in lecturing positions at Birmingham University and the University of Sussex, Parry was appointed to a readership at the recently created University of Warwick in 1968; his was the first appointment in analysis. Two years later, he gave a particularly well-received address at the Sixteenth International Congress of Mathematicians in Nice, France, and was promoted to professor.

He played a key role in the Warwick Mathematics Department, and was Chair of the Department for 2 years. The rapid rise of the Department's international reputation was due to many, among whom Parry featured prominently. His great mathematical achievements were recognized by his early election to the Royal Society in 1984; however, he rarely used the title "Fellow of the Royal Society" except to aid specific causes of interest.

Parry continued to contribute to the mathematical community and others' learning up until his death: he taught the University of Warwick's undergraduate course on ergodic theory as late as 2003.

His published works include more than 80 research articles and four books. His doctoral students include Mark Pollicott and Mary Rees.

He died in Marton, Warwickshire, of cancer exacerbated by MRSA, at the age of 72, on 20 August 2006.

Research
In 1975, Parry and Dennis Sullivan introduced the topological Parry–Sullivan invariant for flows in one-dimensional dynamical systems.

See also
 Parry–Daniels map
 Parry–Sullivan invariant
 Parry measure

References

External links
 Obituaries:

1934 births
2006 deaths
20th-century English mathematicians
21st-century English mathematicians
Dynamical systems theorists
Alumni of Imperial College London
Alumni of the University of Liverpool
Alumni of University College London
Academics of the University of Birmingham
Academics of the University of Sussex
Academics of the University of Warwick
Fellows of the Royal Society
Infectious disease deaths in England
Deaths from cancer in England
Deaths from methicillin-resistant Staphylococcus aureus
People from Coventry